Skarvanes (lit. 'cape of shags') is a village on Sandoy, in the Faroe Islands.

It temporarily became extinct in 2000 when its last permanent inhabitant died, though the population has since rebounded; as of 2013, the population is 13, with most of the houses being uses as holiday homes.

References

External links

Sandoy
Populated places in the Faroe Islands